Kopel Kahana (1895 – 14 July 1978) was a British rabbinical scholar and authority on Jewish, Roman, and English law.

Born in Eisiskes, Lithuania in 1895, Kahana studied at Lithuanian yeshivot and served as rabbi in Bialowieza and Rozanai, Poland.

Before World War II, he went to Cambridge University, where he studied law. From 1946 to 1968 he was lecturer in Talmud and codes at Jews College, London, which before then had trained few rabbis.

Among his published writings are:
Three Great Systems of Jurisprudence (1955), a comparative study of Jewish, Roman, and English Law
The Case for Jewish Civil Law in the Jewish State (1960), which argues that Jewish law contained enough potential to be able to govern Israel with efficiency and justice
The Theory of Marriage in Jewish Law (1966), which expounds the Jewish concept of marriage and correct misconceptions concerning it.

Under the name of "K. Kagan", he contributed articles to some of the leading American and English law reviews.

Kahana died on 14 July 1978.

References

External links
"Kahana (Kagan), Kopel" in Encyclopedia Judaica
Rivon, the quarterly magazine of the Hampstead Synagogue 7:3

1895 births
1978 deaths
20th-century English rabbis
20th-century Lithuanian rabbis
Academics of the London School of Jewish Studies
British Orthodox rabbis